KQWC-FM (95.7 FM) is a radio station broadcasting an adult contemporary music format. Licensed to Webster City, Iowa, United States, the station serves the Fort Dodge area. The station is currently licensed to Fieldview Broadcasting LLC.

History
On January 13, 2003, the station was sold to WMMP, on December 28, 2005, the station was sold to NRG Media, and on December 5, 2005, the station was sold to NRG Media.

References

External links

QWC-FM
Hamilton County, Iowa
Radio stations established in 2003